Samuel Jackson is a former American  Negro league first baseman who played for the Chicago American Giants in 1944 and 1945.

A native of St. Louis, Jackson was one of 10 new players acquired by the American Giants before the 1944 season. In three recorded career games in 1944 and 1945, he posted two hits in seven plate appearances.

References

External links
 and Seamheads

Year of birth missing
Place of birth missing
Chicago American Giants players
Baseball first basemen
Baseball players from Missouri